Charles Wedderburn Dickson (23 February 1863 – 1934) was the director of Jardine Matheson & Co. and member of the Executive Council and Legislative Council of Hong Kong.

Son of W. Dickson and Christina Keswick, daughter of William Keswick of the Jardine Matheson, he was educated in Scotland and arrived in Hong Kong in 1884 and lived in Shanghai from 1894 to 1897. He became the director of Jardine Matheson from 1900 to 1906. He was also the Deputy Chairman of Hongkong and Shanghai Banking Corporation and director of various local companies.

Dickson married to Frances Emmeline Parkes, young daughter of Sir Harry Smith Parkes, British minister at Tokyo and Peking. They had two daughters, Dorothy Parkes Dickson born in 1895 and Mabel Dickson born in 1900.

In 1908 he chose to come overland across America. On arrival he purchased Friars Carse in Dumfrieshire which remained the family home until Fanny sold it to the Post Office (presumably as a retirement home) and moved to the Station Hotel where she lived for the rest of her life.

See also
 List of Executive Council of Hong Kong unofficial members 1896–1941

References

1863 births
1934 deaths
Hong Kong businesspeople
Hong Kong people of British descent
British expatriates in Hong Kong
Members of the Executive Council of Hong Kong
Members of the Legislative Council of Hong Kong
Jardine Matheson Group
HSBC people